is a railway station on the Chitose Line in Eniwa, Hokkaido, Japan, operated by the Hokkaido Railway Company (JR Hokkaido). The station opened on July 1, 1990.  The Hokkaido Brewery of Sapporo Breweries is located in front of the station.

References 

Railway stations in Hokkaido Prefecture
Eniwa, Hokkaido
Railway stations in Japan opened in 1990